Kelly John Mann (born August 17, 1967 in Santa Monica, California) is a former professional baseball catcher who played in the Major Leagues for the Atlanta Braves during 1989 and 1990. He also played for the Pueblo Big Horns and Mobile Baysharks of the Texas-Louisiana League in 1995. After leaving Mobile he joined the army.

External links
 

1967 births
Living people
Atlanta Braves players
Baseball players from Santa Monica, California
Charlotte Knights players
Geneva Cubs players
Greenville Braves players
Major League Baseball catchers
Mobile Baysharks players
Orlando Cubs players
Peoria Chiefs players
Pittsfield Cubs players
Pueblo Bighorns players
Richmond Braves players
Winston-Salem Spirits players
Wytheville Cubs players